Superbird-A, also identified as Superbird-1 before launch, was a geostationary communications satellite designed and manufactured by Ford Aerospace) on the SSL 1300 satellite bus. It was originally ordered by Space Communications Corporation (SCC), which later merged into the SKY Perfect JSAT Group. It had a mixed Ku-band, Ka-band and X-band payload and operated on the 158° East longitude.

It was ordered in 1985 along Superbird-B, Superbird-A1 and Superbird-B1 on the very first order of the SSL 1300 platform. It was also the first satellite of SCC and the second commercial satellite of Japan after JCSAT-1. It was used for video distribution, news gathering, remote publishing and high definition TV service to the main islands of Japan and Okinawa.

Satellite description 
The spacecraft was the first satellite designed and manufactured by Ford Aerospace on the SSL 1300 satellite bus. It was based on the design of the Intelsat V series and offered a three-axis stabilized platform.

With its solar panels fully extended it spanned . Its power system generated approximately 3,984 watts of power due to two wings with three solar panels each. It also a NiH2 battery to survive the solar eclipses. It would serve as the main satellite on the 158° East longitude position of the Superbird.

It included enough propellant for orbit circularization and 10 years of operation.

Its payload is composed of 23 Ku-band, 3 Ka-band, plus 2 X-band transponders.

History 
Space Communications Corporation (SCC) was founded in 1985, the same year as the original companies that later formed JSAT. In 1986, SCC ordered four spacecraft from Ford Aerospace, Superbird-1, Superbird-2, Superbird-A1 and Superbird-B1.

On 5 June 1989 at 22:37:18 UTC, Superbird-1, the second private communications satellite of Japan, was launched aboard an Ariane 44L along DFS Kopernikus-1. It was injected into a 185 km x 35,981 km geosynchronous transfer orbit (GTO), from which it climbed through three liquid apogee engine (LAE) firings. Once in its 158° East longitude position, it was rechristened as Superbird-A.

References 

Communications satellites in geostationary orbit
Satellites using the SSL 1300 bus
Spacecraft launched in 1989
Communications satellites of Japan
1989 in Japan